Matveyevsky (masculine), Matveyevskaya (feminine), or Matveyevskoye (neuter) is the name of several  rural localities in Russia.

Arkhangelsk Oblast
As of 2010, five rural localities in Arkhangelsk Oblast bear this name:
Matveyevskaya, Kholmogorsky District, Arkhangelsk Oblast, a village in Kekhotsky Selsoviet of Kholmogorsky District
Matveyevskaya, Konoshsky District, Arkhangelsk Oblast, a village in Yertsevsky Selsoviet of Konoshsky District
Matveyevskaya, Plesetsky District, Arkhangelsk Oblast, a village in Yarnemsky Selsoviet of Plesetsky District
Matveyevskaya, Ustyansky District, Arkhangelsk Oblast, a village in Rostovsky Selsoviet of Ustyansky District
Matveyevskaya, Vilegodsky District, Arkhangelsk Oblast, a village in Ilyinsky Selsoviet of Vilegodsky District

Ivanovo Oblast
As of 2010, one rural locality in Ivanovo Oblast bears this name:
Matveyevskaya, Ivanovo Oblast, a village in Yuryevetsky District

Kabardino-Balkar Republic
As of 2010, one rural locality in the Kabardino-Balkar Republic bears this name:
Matveyevsky, Kabardino-Balkar Republic, a khutor in Prokhladnensky District

Kirov Oblast
As of 2010, two rural localities in Kirov Oblast bear this name:
Matveyevskaya, Afanasyevsky District, Kirov Oblast, a village in Biserovsky Rural Okrug of Afanasyevsky District
Matveyevskaya, Luzsky District, Kirov Oblast, a village under the administrative jurisdiction of the Town of Luza in Luzsky District

Komi Republic
As of 2010, one rural locality in the Komi Republic bears this name:
Matveyevskaya, Komi Republic, a village in Loyma Selo Administrative Territory of Priluzsky District

Kostroma Oblast
As of 2010, two rural localities in Kostroma Oblast bear this name:
Matveyevskoye, Galichsky District, Kostroma Oblast, a village in Orekhovskoye Settlement of Galichsky District
Matveyevskoye, Sharyinsky District, Kostroma Oblast, a selo in Golovinskoye Settlement of Sharyinsky District

Moscow Oblast
As of 2010, one rural locality in Moscow Oblast bears this name:
Matveyevskoye, Moscow Oblast, a village in Lagovskoye Rural Settlement of Podolsky District

Nizhny Novgorod Oblast
As of 2010, one rural locality in Nizhny Novgorod Oblast bears this name:
Matveyevskoye, Nizhny Novgorod Oblast, a village in Berezyatsky Selsoviet of Tonshayevsky District

Rostov Oblast
As of 2010, one rural locality in Rostov Oblast bears this name:
Matveyevsky, Rostov Oblast, a khutor in Kalininskoye Rural Settlement of Sholokhovsky District

Ryazan Oblast
As of 2010, one rural locality in Ryazan Oblast bears this name:
Matveyevskoye, Ryazan Oblast, a selo in Pridorozhny Rural Okrug of Sasovsky District

Tver Oblast
As of 2010, three rural localities in Tver Oblast bear this name:
Matveyevskoye, Kalininsky District, Tver Oblast, a village in Kalininsky District
Matveyevskoye (selo), Kesovogorsky District, Tver Oblast, a selo in Kesovogorsky District
Matveyevskoye (village), Kesovogorsky District, Tver Oblast, a village in Kesovogorsky District

Vologda Oblast
As of 2010, twelve rural localities in Vologda Oblast bear this name:
Matveyevskoye, Kirillovsky District, Vologda Oblast, a village in Nikolo-Torzhsky Selsoviet of Kirillovsky District
Matveyevskoye, Sheksninsky District, Vologda Oblast, a village in Yeremeyevsky Selsoviet of Sheksninsky District
Matveyevskoye, Kubensky Selsoviet, Vologodsky District, Vologda Oblast, a village in Kubensky Selsoviet of Vologodsky District
Matveyevskoye, Markovsky Selsoviet, Vologodsky District, Vologda Oblast, a village in Markovsky Selsoviet of Vologodsky District
Matveyevskoye, Nefedovsky Selsoviet, Vologodsky District, Vologda Oblast, a village in Nefedovsky Selsoviet of Vologodsky District
Matveyevskaya, Nyuksensky District, Vologda Oblast, a village in Kosmarevsky Selsoviet of Nyuksensky District
Matveyevskaya, Tarnogsky District, Vologda Oblast, a village in Shevdenitsky Selsoviet of Tarnogsky District
Matveyevskaya, Vashkinsky District, Vologda Oblast, a village in Ivanovsky Selsoviet of Vashkinsky District
Matveyevskaya, Sibirsky Selsoviet, Verkhovazhsky District, Vologda Oblast, a village in Sibirsky Selsoviet of Verkhovazhsky District
Matveyevskaya, Verkhnetermengsky Selsoviet, Verkhovazhsky District, Vologda Oblast, a village in Verkhnetermengsky Selsoviet of Verkhovazhsky District
Matveyevskaya, Verkhovsky Selsoviet, Verkhovazhsky District, Vologda Oblast, a village in Verkhovsky Selsoviet of Verkhovazhsky District
Matveyevskaya, Vozhegodsky District, Vologda Oblast, a village in Mishutinsky Selsoviet of Vozhegodsky District

Yaroslavl Oblast
As of 2010, two rural localities in Yaroslavl Oblast bear this name:
Matveyevskoye, Rostovsky District, Yaroslavl Oblast, a selo in Nikolsky Rural Okrug of Rostovsky District
Matveyevskoye, Yaroslavsky District, Yaroslavl Oblast, a village in Bekrenevsky Rural Okrug of Yaroslavsky District